The Ukrainian Records in Swimming are the fastest times ever swum by a swimmer representing Ukraine. These records are kept/maintained by the Ukrainian Swimming Federation (Федерація плавання України).

Records are recognized for the following long course (50m) and short course (25m) events:
freestyle: 50, 100, 200, 400, 800 and 1500;
backstroke: 50, 100 and 200;
breaststroke: 50, 100 and 200;
butterfly: 50, 100 and 200;
individual medley (I.M.): 100 (25m only), 200 and 400;
relays: 4x50 free (25m only), 4x100 free, 4x200 free, 4x50 medley (25m only) and 4x100 medley.

All records were set in finals unless noted otherwise.

Long Course (50m)

Men

|-bgcolor=#DDDDDD
|colspan=9|
|-

|-bgcolor=#DDDDDD
|colspan=9|
|-

|-bgcolor=#DDDDDD
|colspan=9|
|-

|-bgcolor=#DDDDDD
|colspan=9|
|-

|-bgcolor=#DDDDDD
|colspan=9|
|-

Women

|-bgcolor=#DDDDDD
|colspan=9|
|-

|-bgcolor=#DDDDDD
|colspan=9|
|-

|-bgcolor=#DDDDDD
|colspan=9|
|-

|-bgcolor=#DDDDDD
|colspan=9|
|-

|-bgcolor=#DDDDDD
|colspan=9|
|-

Mixed relay

Short Course (25m)

Men

|-bgcolor=#DDDDDD
|colspan=9|
|-

|-bgcolor=#DDDDDD
|colspan=9|
|-

|-bgcolor=#DDDDDD
|colspan=9|
|-

|-bgcolor=#DDDDDD
|colspan=9|
|-

|-bgcolor=#DDDDDD
|colspan=9|
|-

Women

|-bgcolor=#DDDDDD
|colspan=9|
|-

|-bgcolor=#DDDDDD
|colspan=9|
|-

|-bgcolor=#DDDDDD
|colspan=9|
|-

|-bgcolor=#DDDDDD
|colspan=9|
|-

|-bgcolor=#DDDDDD
|colspan=9|
|-

fWR: World Record when originally swum.
Note 4x200: In the short-course Women's 4x200 Free Relay, the Federation has established a time of 8:15.00 as the mark a relay team must meet/better in order to establish the national record. As of December 2016, no team had yet done this.

Mixed relay

References
General
Ukrainian Long Course Records 1 January 2023 updated
Ukrainian Short Course Records 1 January 2023 updated
Specific

External links
Ukrainian Swimming Federation
Ukrainian Swimming Federation records page

Ukraine
Records
Swimming
Swimming